Classical Gas is a 1987 album by new age group Mannheim Steamroller and guitarist/composer Mason Williams. The album's title piece, "Classical Gas", was originally featured on Williams's 1968 solo album The Mason Williams Phonograph Record.

Track listing

All tracks written by Mason Williams unless otherwise indicated.

"Classical Gas" – 3:32
"Sunflower" – 2:14
"Samba Beach" – 3:59
"Country Idyll" – 2:18
"Saturday Night at the World" – 3:56
"Shady Dell" – 3:23
"Katydid's Ditty" – 0:58
"Greensleeves" (traditional) – 3:07
"Doot-Doot" – 2:08
"La Chanson de Claudine" – 3:17
"McCall" – 2:41
"Vancouver Island" – 2:50
"Baroque-a-Nova" – 3:06

Personnel

Performance Credits

Mannheim Steamroller – primary artist; drums; recorder
Mason Williams – primary artist; guitar; horn
Clinton Gregory – cello
Jackson Berkey – keyboards
Ron Cooley – guitar; electric guitar; rhythm guitar
Chip Davis – drums; recorder; baton
Bob Jenkins – oboe
Deborah Fuller – violin
Joey Gulizia – percussion
Eric Hansen – bass
David Low – cello
Roxanne Adams – violin
Grace Granata – violin
David Kappy – French horn
Richard Lohmann – violin
Bill Ritchie – double bass
Bill Erickson – accordion
Sherrie Goeden – viola
Joshua Kuhl – double bass
Michelle Mathewson – viola
Arthur McCann – saxophone
Jim Schanilec – trombone
Scott Shoemaker – violin
David Wampler – trombone
Candida Wiley – violin
Margaret Wilmeth – cello 
Bochmann String Quartet – group

Technical Credits
Mason Williams – composer; liner notes
Mannheim Steamroller – contributor
Chip Davis – director; producer; contributor; orchestration
Clete Baker – mastering
John Boyd – engineer
Joe Gastwirt – mastering
Howie Weinberg – mastering
Steve Shipps – contributor
Dick Lewsey – engineer

In popular culture

The title track was featured in "The Great Crane Robbery", a 2000 episode of Frasier. When Frasier's new boss copies his apartment down to the last detail, Frasier tries redecorating, and the song plays over a montage of him trying a long series of ridiculous styles of décor.
The title track appeared in S1:E5 "Fork" of Netflix's limited series, "The Queen's Gambit."
The title track was briefly featured in S5:E8 “Marco Polo” of HBO’s “The Sopranos.”

References

External links
Classical Gas at AllMusic
Classical Gas at Discogs

Mason Williams albums
Mannheim Steamroller albums
American Gramaphone albums
Collaborative albums